Vannes-sur-Cosson (literally Vannes on Cosson) is a commune in the Loiret department in north-central France.

Geography
The river Cosson has its source in the commune.

See also
Communes of the Loiret department

References

Vannessurcosson